Sodium hydride is the chemical compound with the empirical formula NaH. This alkali metal hydride is primarily used as a strong yet combustible base in organic synthesis. NaH is a saline (salt-like) hydride, composed of Na+ and H− ions, in contrast to molecular hydrides such as borane, methane, ammonia, and water. It is an ionic material that is insoluble in all solvents (other than molten Na), consistent with the fact that H− ions do not exist in solution. Because of the insolubility of NaH, all reactions involving NaH occur at the surface of the solid.

Basic properties and structure
NaH is produced by the direct reaction of hydrogen and liquid sodium. Pure NaH is colorless, although samples generally appear grey. NaH is ca. 40% denser than Na (0.968 g/cm3).

NaH, like LiH, KH, RbH, and CsH, adopts the NaCl crystal structure. In this motif, each Na+ ion is surrounded by six H− centers in an octahedral geometry. The ionic radii of H− (146 pm in NaH) and F− (133 pm) are comparable, as judged by the Na−H and Na−F distances.

"Inverse sodium hydride"
A very unusual situation occurs in a compound dubbed "inverse sodium hydride", which contains H+ and Na− ions.  Na− is an alkalide, and this compound differs from ordinary sodium hydride in having a much higher energy content due to the net displacement of two electrons from hydrogen to sodium.  A derivative of this "inverse sodium hydride" arises in the presence of the base [36]adamanzane.  This molecule irreversibly encapsulates the H+ and shields it from interaction with the alkalide Na−.  Theoretical work has suggested that even an unprotected protonated tertiary amine complexed with the sodium alkalide might be metastable under certain solvent conditions, though the barrier to reaction would be small and finding a suitable solvent might be difficult.

Applications in organic synthesis

As a strong base
NaH is a base of wide scope and utility in organic chemistry. As a superbase, it is capable of deprotonating a range of even weak Brønsted acids to give the corresponding sodium derivatives. Typical "easy" substrates contain O-H, N-H, S-H bonds, including alcohols, phenols, pyrazoles, and thiols.

NaH notably deprotonates carbon acids (i.e., C-H bonds) such as 1,3-dicarbonyls such as malonic esters. The resulting sodium derivatives can be alkylated. NaH is widely used to promote condensation reactions of carbonyl compounds via the Dieckmann condensation, Stobbe condensation, Darzens condensation, and Claisen condensation. Other carbon acids susceptible to deprotonation by NaH include sulfonium salts and DMSO. NaH is used to make sulfur ylides, which in turn are used to convert ketones into epoxides, as in the Johnson–Corey–Chaykovsky reaction.

As a reducing agent
NaH reduces certain main group compounds, but analogous reactivity is very rare in organic chemistry (see below). Notably boron trifluoride reacts to give diborane and sodium fluoride:

6 NaH + 2 BF3 → B2H6 + 6 NaF

Si–Si and S–S bonds in disilanes and disulfides are also reduced.

A series of reduction reactions, including the hydrodecyanation of tertiary nitriles, reduction of imines to amines, and amides to aldehydes, can be effected by a composite reagent composed of sodium hydride and an alkali metal iodide (NaH⋅MI, M = Li, Na).

Hydrogen storage
Although not commercially significant sodium hydride has been proposed for hydrogen storage for use in fuel cell vehicles.  In one experimental implementation, plastic pellets containing NaH are crushed in the presence of water to release the hydrogen.  One challenge with this technology is the regeneration of NaH from the NaOH.

Practical considerations
Sodium hydride is sold as a mixture of 60% sodium hydride (w/w) in mineral oil. Such a dispersion is safer to handle and weigh than pure NaH. The compound is often used in this form but the pure grey solid can be prepared by rinsing the commercial product with pentane or THF, with care being taken because the waste solvent will contain traces of NaH and can ignite in air. Reactions involving NaH require air-free techniques. Typically NaH is used as a suspension in THF, a solvent that resists attack by strong bases but can solvate many reactive sodium compounds.

Safety
NaH can ignite spontaneously in air. It also reacts vigorously with water to release hydrogen, which is also flammable, and sodium hydroxide (NaOH), a caustic base. In practice, most sodium hydride is dispensed as a dispersion in oil, which can be safely handled in air. Although sodium hydride is widely used in DMSO, DMF or DMA, there have been many cases of fires and/or explosions from such mixtures.

References

Cited sources

Metal hydrides
Reagents for organic chemistry
Sodium compounds
Superbases
Rock salt crystal structure
Semiconductor materials